Charles Lécrivain was a French classicist (1860—1942). Lécrivain graduated from the École Normale Supérieure. He finished his doctorate theses in 1888, which later became classics on those subjects (see below). Lécrivain was one of the prominent contributors to the "Dictionnaire des Antiquités grecques et romaines".

Publications 
De agris publicis imperatoriisque ab Augusti tempore usque ad finem imperii romani, Paris 1887.

Le sénat romain depuis Dioclétien à Rome et à Constantinople, Paris 1888.

238 articles in "Dictionnaire des Antiquités grecques et romaines". The most notables are: Eisphora, Epikleros, Eupatrides, Helotae, Phratria, Phylë, Prytaneia, Trapezitai, Gens, Hospitium, Latifundia, Lictor,
Manumissio, Patricii, Patrimonium, Plebs, Praetor, Quaestor, Senatus, Tribuni plebis, and Vicarius.

References

Bibliography

External links 
 Obituary by Dupont-Ferrier on persee.fr

French scholars of Roman history
École Normale Supérieure alumni
1860 births
1942 deaths